Patrick Duarte Flores (born 1969) is a Filipino curator, critic, and professor. Born in Manila, he received degrees in humanities, art history, and Philippine studies at the University of the Philippines Diliman. He is a professor of Art Studies in the Department of Art Studies at the University of the Philippines and curator of the Vargas Museum in Manila. He was also a curator of the Arts Division, Philippine National Museum and curator of the Philippine Pavilion at the Venice Biennale in 2015. He was the artistic director of the 2019 Singapore Biennale.

Published works

Painting History: Revisions in Philippine Colonial Art (Manila: University of the Philippines Press, 1999)
Crossings : Philippine works from the Singapore Art Museum (Singapore Art Museum, 2004)
 Remarkable Collection: Art, History, and the National Museum (2006)
Past Peripheral: Curation in Southeast Asia (NUS Museum/University of Michigan, 2008)
Forming Lineage: The National Artists for the Visual Arts of the University of the Philippines (Manila: University of the Philippines, 2008)
The life and art of Botong Francisco (Manila: Vibal Publishing, 2010)
 The life and art of Francisco Coching (Manila: Vibal Publishing, 2010)
Art After War, 1948-1969 (Manila: Modern Reader, 2015)
The Philippine Contemporary: Sa Pagitan Ng Mga Landas / To Scale the Past and the Possible (Metropolitan Museum of Manila, 2018)

References 

Living people
Filipino critics
1969 births
Filipino writers
Filipino curators